The 2014 Challenger ATP Cachantún Cup was a professional tennis tournament played on clay courts. It was the seventh edition of the tournament which was part of the 2014 ATP Challenger Tour. It took place in Santiago, Chile between 14 and 20 April.

ATP entrants

Seeds

Other entrants
The following players received wildcards into the singles main draw:
  Guillermo Núñez
  Matías Sborowitz
  Bastián Malla
  Nicolás Jarry

The following players received entry from the qualifying draw:
  Pedro Cachín
  Jorge Aguilar
  Thiemo de Bakker
  Juan Pablo Paz

Doubles main-draw entrants

Seeds

Other entrants
The following pairs received wildcards into the doubles main draw:
 David Fleming /  Víctor Núñez
 Alejandro Fabbri /  Tomás Lipovšek Puches
 Pedro Cachín /  Guillermo Nunez

Champions

Singles

 Thiemo de Bakker def.  James Duckworth, 4–6, 7–6(12–10), 6–1

Doubles

 Cristian Garín /  Nicolás Jarry def.  Jorge Aguilar /  Hans Podlipnik Castillo by Walkover

External links
Official website

Challenger ATP Cachantun Cup
2014 - Doubles
Cach